Dalovice is the name of several locations in the Czech Republic:

 Dalovice (Karlovy Vary District), a village in the Karlovy Vary Region
 Dalovice (Mladá Boleslav District), a village in the Central Bohemian Region